Hrushawka is a Minsk Metro station. It was opened on November 7, 2012, along with the metro stations of Mikhalova and Pyatrowshchyna.

Gallery

References
http://minsk-metro.net

Minsk Metro stations
Railway stations opened in 2012